Spruce Bay is a hamlet in the Canadian province of Saskatchewan.

Demographics 

References

Designated places in Saskatchewan
Organized hamlets in Saskatchewan
Spiritwood No. 496, Saskatchewan
Division No. 16, Saskatchewan